= Oddness =

Oddness may refer to:

- Eccentricity (behavior)
- Oddness of numbers, for which see parity (mathematics)
